New Oriental Education & Technology Group Inc., more commonly New Oriental, is a provider of private educational services in China. The headquarters of New Oriental is located in Haidian District, Beijing. It is currently the largest comprehensive private educational company in China based on the number of program offerings, total student enrollments, and geographic presence. The business of New Oriental includes pre-school education, general courses for students of various age levels, online education, overseas study consulting, and textbook publishing. New Oriental was the first Chinese educational institution to enter the New York Stock Exchange in the United States, holding its IPO in 2006. As of 2016, New Oriental has built 67 short-time language educational schools, 20 book stores, 771 learning centers, and more than 5,000 third-party bookstores in 56 cities in China. New Oriental has had over 26.6 million student enrollments, including over 1.3 million enrollments in first quarter 2017. The company's market capitalization was approximately US$14 billion.

The company has been investing heavily in online education since 2015.

History
Beijing New Oriental School was established on November 16, 1993, by Yu Minhong, an English teacher at Peking University.  He initially focused  on the TOEFL and GRE exams but then  expanded the company to provide services for various other exams and fields as well. The school is now one of the largest companies in China, and on September 7, 2006, New Oriental was listed on New York Stock Exchange.

The company
As of 2016 there are 67 schools, learning centers, vocational training centers and offices all over Mainland China. The North America Department and United Kingdom Department are the company's main source of revenue, which focuses on preparing students for the TOEFL, SAT, ACT GRE, GMAT, IELTS and LSAT. The company also offers  other services including preparing students for the National English Graduate Exam, Teenage English Courses, Pop English (Kindergarten and Primary School English), consultation on preparing for interviews, consultation on preparing admission letters.

Key people 
Yu Minhong (b. October 15, 1962; also known as "Michael Yu") was appointed CEO and chairman of the company, starting in 1993. He started his career at Peking University in 1985. He founded New Oriental in 1993 after he left Peking University. He is vice chairman of Beijing Young Entrepreneurs Association.

Louis Hsieh served as New Oriental's chief financial officer from 2005 to 2015, and president from 2009 to 2016.

Legal conflicts with ETS
In 2001, the US Educational Testing Service sent a public letter to US universities, reminding them to pay special attention to Chinese students' GRE scores. In this letter, ETS hinted that New Oriental used their past exam questions in teaching without authorization.

In January, 2001, New Oriental was sued by the ETS for illegally copying, publishing, and selling its testing questions for examinations for non-English-speaking students since 1997. On September 27, 2003, the First Intermediate People's Court of Beijing made a ruling during the first trial, ordering the Chinese school to pay over 10 million yuan (about 1.2 million US dollars) to the ETS in compensation for the infringement.

The Higher People's Court of Beijing maintained that the Beijing-based New Oriental School (NOS) should pay compensation to the ETS, for the infringement of copy and trademark rights. However, the higher court reduced the sum of compensation by over 6 million yuan (about 722,000 US dollars) to 3,740,186.2 yuan (about 450,624 US dollars) plus 22,000 yuan (about 2,650 US dollars) for court charges.

See also
American Dreams in China, a movie about the company
Andrew Left

References

External links

 
Education companies of China
Companies based in Beijing
Chinese companies established in 1993
Companies listed on the New York Stock Exchange
2006 initial public offerings

pt:Zhang Jingchu